The World Council for the Welfare of the Blind (WCWB) was an organization of agencies for the blind (visually impaired) established in 1949. It combined with the International Federation of the Blind in 1984 to create the World Blind Union.

References
 Marc Maurer: World Blind Union Fifth General Assembly, The Braille Monitor, March, 2001 Edition.

Blindness organizations